Dangatar Abdyeviç Köpekow (12 May 1933 – 21 September 2011) was a Turkmen general and the former minister of defense of Turkmenistan and the last chairman of the Turkmen KGB.

Early life and career

Security career
Köpekow was born in Ashgabat in 1933. He worked as a junior operative and operative with the First Department of the KGB at the Council of Ministers of the Turkmen SSR. Then he was transferred to the First Main Directorate of the KGB of the Soviet Union (external intelligence). In 1968, he was sent to Iran to work as an assistant to the KGB resident in Mashhad. In 1971, he was deported back to the USSR. Twenty years later, in March 1991, he was appointed the chairman of the KGB of the Turkmen SSR.

Defence Minister
In January 1992, he was appointed the first minister of defense of independent Turkmenistan and soon he was also appointed rector of the Military Institute of the Ministry of Defence. In the early 1990s, Köpekow was awarded the military rank of Colonel-General, and later became a General of the Army of Turkmenistan. He had a great influence on the president of Turkmenistan, Saparmyrat Nyýazow.

On 12 September 1998, a terrorist attack was committed in Ashgabat, which resulted in the death of seven people. On 17 September, Köpekow was removed from his post, stripped of his rank, and appointed head of the Department of Law Enforcement and Military Agencies of the Cabinet of Ministers of Turkmenistan.

Later life
He was awarded the Order of the Red Star, as well as the Edermenlik Order in 1993, and the Order "For Love of the Fatherland" in 1996. He was also made an Honorary Elder of the People in 1995. He died on 21 September 2011, in a military hospital. He had lived in retirement in Ashgabat since 1999.

Ranks 
 Major (1971)
 Lieutenant-colonel (1974)
 Colonel 
 Major-general (1990)
 Lieutenant-general (1992)
 Colonel-general (1993)
 General of the Army

See also 
 Government of Turkmenistan
 Ministry of Defense of Turkmenistan

References 

1933 births
2011 deaths
Ministers of Defence of Turkmenistan
Turkmenistani generals
KGB officers
Soviet politicians
Turkmenistan politicians